North Wayne Historic District is a national historic district located at Wayne, Delaware County, Pennsylvania. The district includes 190 contributing buildings in a residential area of Wayne. The contributing dwellings were built between 1881 and 1925, and include notable examples of Shingle Style and Colonial Revival architecture. The district also reflects suburban development in the late-19th century as it was a major component of a large, planned, railroad commuter suburb called "Wayne Estate." It is located north of the South Wayne Historic District.

It was added to the National Register of Historic Places in 1985.

Houses

References

External links

Historic districts on the National Register of Historic Places in Pennsylvania
Historic districts in Delaware County, Pennsylvania
National Register of Historic Places in Delaware County, Pennsylvania
Radnor Township, Delaware County, Pennsylvania